The Sunbeam Tiger is a racing car, built by Sunbeam of Wolverhampton during the 1920s. It was the last car to be competitive both as a land speed record holder, and as a circuit-racing car.

Design and engine 

The chassis and bodywork of the Sunbeam were conventional for racing cars of their time.

The car's novelty lay with its engine. Sunbeam's 1925 Grand Prix engine had been a successful 2-litre straight-6 twin-overhead-cam. This car was to use a pair of the same block and head arrangements, mated to a single 75° vee crankcase to produce a 3,976 cc V12.

Land Speed Records 
Henry Segrave was so keen to test the new car and engine that he took it to Brooklands in September 1925, still unpainted. Minor works, including the bright red paint still notable today, were done over the winter.

Spring 1926 saw Segrave on the wide, flat beach at Southport. The Sunbeam was the smallest capacity internal combustion-engined car ever to hold the Land Speed Record.

Racing 
After the land speed record, the car returned to Grand Prix racing at Brooklands, Boulogne and San Sebastian.

At the time of the land speed record attempt, the car was fitted with a narrow inlet cowling over the radiator, similar to that of the Sunbeam 350HP. For racing, a flat open radiator grille was used. The narrow cowling has re-appeared in preservation.

Tigress 
One sister car to Tiger was built and named Tigress.

It survives today, fitted with a Napier Lion engine and racing in British Vintage events as the "Sunbeam-Napier".

Today 
The Sunbeam Tiger is preserved today in Utah, restored to the streamlined radiator cowling fitted for record-breaking. As of 2006, the engine is reportedly being rebuilt after suffering foreign object damage whilst vintage racing, hence the static display in LSR trim.

The 'Tiger' name 
In 1964 and 1972 the "Tiger" name was revived within the marque, first for a V8 version of the Sunbeam Alpine, the Sunbeam Tiger. Later it appeared on the more mundane Hillman Avenger Tiger, which resembled a tiger by being orange with black stripes, if little else.

Photographs

References 

Tiger (1925)
Wheel-driven land speed record cars